Blue River Township is one of nine townships in Johnson County, Indiana. As of the 2010 census, its population was 4,936 and it contained 2,096 housing units.

History
The Furnas Mill Bridge was listed on the National Register of Historic Places in 2001.

Geography

References

External links
 Indiana Township Association
 United Township Association of Indiana

Townships in Johnson County, Indiana
Townships in Indiana